Antoine and Antoinette is a 1947 French comedy film directed by Jacques Becker. It was shot at the Saint-Maurice Studios in Paris. The film's sets were designed by the art director Robert-Jules Garnier. It was entered into the 1947 Cannes Film Festival.

Synopsis
Antoine and Antoinette are a working class family living and working in Paris. He is employed in a printing press and she in a department store. The couple are poor, but have many friends. However Antoine is jealous of the attention paid to the vivacious Antoinette by other men, despite the fact she is devoted to him. An apparent lottery win seems to have solved their financial problems, until Antoine loses the winning ticket on the Paris Metro.

Main cast
 Roger Pigaut as Antoine Moulin
 Claire Mafféi as Antoinette Moulin
 Noël Roquevert as Mr. Roland
 Gaston Modot as civil servant
 Made Siamé as the shopkeeper's wife
 Pierre Trabaud as Riton
 Jacques Meyran as M. Barbelot
 François Joux as bridegroom
 Gérard Oury as customer
 Charles Camus as the shopkeeper
 Émile Drain as father-in-law
 Annette Poivre as Juliette

References

External links
 

1947 comedy films
1947 films
French black-and-white films
Films directed by Jacques Becker
French comedy films
1940s French-language films
Films set in Paris
Gaumont Film Company films
Palme d'Or winners
1940s French films